Barbu Ștefănescu Delavrancea ; pen name of Barbu Ștefan; April 11, 1858 in Bucharest – April 29, 1918 in Iași) was a Romanian writer and poet, considered one of the greatest figures in the National awakening of Romania.

Early life and studies
Barbu Ștefănescu Delavrancea was born on April 11, 1858 in the village of Delea Nouă, now a suburb of Bucharest. He was the ninth child of Ștefan Tudorică Albu and Iana (Ioana). His father originates in Vrancea. Assigned to Sohatu, Ilfov, he leaves Vrancea for Bucharest and becomes guildmaster of carters transporting grain from the scaffolds of Giurgiu and Oltenița. Barbu's mother was the daughter of widow Stana from Postovari, on the Filipescu estate.

He spent the first years of life with his father, then learned to read and write with deacon Ion Pestreanu from St. George the New Church. In 1866, Barbu is enrolled in the School of boys no. 4 directly in the second grade. Educator Spirache Dănilescu add the father's surname suffix "-escu", and thus the future writer bears the name Barbu Ștefănescu. In 1867 he transfers to the Royal School, where will follow the third and fourth classes. He follows high school at Gheorghe Lazăr, first class, and the other seven at St. Sava. In 1878 is enrolled in the Faculty of Law in Bucharest. After sustaining license (1882) goes to specialization in Paris, but fails to get his doctorate.

Literary activity

Due to his extremely laborious work, in 1912 he became a titular member of the Romanian Academy. Barbu Ștefănescu Delavrancea unfolds a varied activity: substitute teacher at the Faculty of Letters of the University of Bucharest, journalist, lawyer (is famous the Caion trial, filed to Ion Luca Caragiale in conjunction with the paternity of drama The Scourge, when in the courtroom, to listen to the arguments of lawyers, was entered only upon invitation), writer (novelist and playwright).

His publicistic activity consists in the collaboration with newspapers România Liberă and Epoca (since 1884), whose editor was; in 1887 leads, for a short period, Lupta Literară, and the following year becomes editor of Bogdan Petriceicu Hasdeu's magazine Revista Nouă and collaborator to Democrația and Voința națională; since 1893 starts working with Literatura și știința of Constantin Dobrogeanu-Gherea. Other publications that worked over time were: Revista Literară, Familia, Românul.

In literature debuts in 1877 with patriotic poem Stante, part of volume Poiana lungă, signed Barbu, and in 1883 debuts as novelist with Sultănica, follows Bunicul, Bunica, Domnul Vucea and, especially, Hagi Tudose (1903). In the following year publishes under the pseudonym "Delavrancea". Drawing on folk, he published several tales: Neghiniță, Palatul de cleștar, Dăparte, dăparte, Moș Crăciun, etc.

Barbu Ștefănescu Delavrancea is widely known especially for his historical trilogy: Apus de soare (1909), Viforul (1910), Luceafărul (1910), full of romantic breath.

As politician
As a politician, is distinguished by holding several dignities:
Mayor of Bucharest (1899–1901),
Minister of Public Works (December 29, 1910 – March 27, 1912),
Minister of Industry and Trade (since July 10, 1917), deputy.

References

External links

19th-century Romanian poets
Romanian male poets
Romanian dramatists and playwrights
Writers from Bucharest
Burials at Eternitatea cemetery
1858 births
1918 deaths
Male dramatists and playwrights
20th-century Romanian poets
Titular members of the Romanian Academy
19th-century male writers
Members of the Chamber of Deputies (Romania)
Romanian Ministers of Public Works
Romanian Ministers of Industry and Commerce
20th-century Romanian male writers